Derai is an upazila (sub-district) of the Sunamganj District in northeastern Bangladesh, part of the Sylhet Division.

History

Derai was previously known as Babaganj Bazar. It was home to two influential Hindu residents; Jitarāma and Dvidarāma, who renamed the area to Derai Bazar. On 10 December 1892, the Assam Gazette notification #5954 recognised the name of the area as Derai. In 1938, the Nankar Rebellion started in Derai and surrounding areas. Derai was made a thana in 1942.

During the Bangladesh Liberation War of 1971, a brawl took place in Derai between the Pakistan Army and Bengali freedom fighting forces. Among the freedom fighters here, Commander Ataur Rahman and Abdul Khaliq were wounded with Azimullah, Kuti Miah and Gopendra Das being killed.

Derai was heavily affected by the 1974 floods and that of 1988. The Jamiah Hafizia Hussainiya Madrasa was founded in 1978. In 1982, Derai thana was made an upazila. The 2004 Indian Ocean earthquake and tsunami was also very damaging to Derai.

Demographics
As of the 2001 Bangladesh census, Derai has a population of 202791; male 105252, female 97539; Muslim 144136, Hindu 58576, Buddhist 33 and others 46. Males constitute 51.38% of the population, and females 48.62%.

Education
Derai has an average literacy rate of 25.3% (7+ years), and the national average of 32.4% literate.

Administration
Derai thana was formed in 1942 and it was turned into an upazila in 1982.

Derai Upazila is divided into Derai Municipality and nine union parishads: Bhatipara, Charnarchar, Derai Sarmangal, Jagdal, Karimpur,  Kulanj, Rafinagar, Rajanagar, and Taral. The union parishads are subdivided into 137 mauzas and 232 villages.

Derai Municipality is subdivided into 9 wards and 29 mahallas.

Upazila Chairmen

Notable people
Gulzar Ahmed Chowdhury, former Member of Parliament
Suranjit Sengupta, politician, lawyer
Joya Sengupta, politician
Kakon Bibi, secret agent
Mifta Uddin Chowdhury Rumi, politician and justice
Nasir Uddin Chowdhury, politician
Nasum Ahmed, cricketer
Shah Abdul Karim, folk minstrel

See also
Upazilas of Bangladesh
Districts of Bangladesh
Divisions of Bangladesh

References

 
Upazilas of Sunamganj District